The Sochi Arboretum is a unique collection of subtropical flora and fauna. It is a monument of landscape architecture located in the Khosta district of the city of Sochi, Krasnodar Krai, in Russia. It includes 76 species of pine, 80 species of oak, and 24 species of palm.

Arboreta
Sochi
Natural monuments of Russia
Cultural heritage monuments of federal significance in Krasnodar Krai